is a Japanese actor and singer. He played Ootori Chotarou in The Prince of Tennis movie and The Prince of Tennis musicals.

His first CD, named 逆光, was released on 7 November 2007, and contained 9 songs, all written and produced by Koji. He also played guitar in a band called Joker. Their first single, 'No.1', was released on 7 December 2011.

Discography
Album
 逆光(Gyakkou) (2007)
 こんな時代だから (2009)
 どーも。 (2010)

Single/EP
 青春なんて (2010)
 No.1 (2011)(in Joker)

Stage performances
 The Imperial Match Hyoutei as Ootori Choutarou
 The Imperial Match Hyoutei in Winter as Ootori Choutarou
 Dream Live 3rd as Ootori Choutarou
 Advancement Match Rokkaku feat. Hyoutei Gakuen as Ootori Choutarou
 ROCK'N JAM MUSICAL 2 as Koutarou
 Dream Live 4th as Ootori Choutarou

Live performances
 FIRST DATE at Yokohama - November 23, 2005
 Second Live『Love2』DATE in Yokohama
 Date Kouji One Man Live in Shinjuku Space Zero - 24 December 2006

TV shows
 Regular on Yokohama Music Explorer

Musicals
 The Prince of Tennis as Ootori Choutarou

References

External links
 Musical Prince of Tennis Official Site
 The Prince of Tennis Movie Official Site
 Official Facebook Page
 Official Joker Website
 Official Blog

1987 births
Living people
Japanese male actors